Bruno Vicino (born 7 September 1952) is former Italian cyclist, now a directeur sportif with the Lampre cycling team. He was a professional from 1982 to 1987. He won the UCI Motor-paced World Championships three times.

References

Living people
Directeur sportifs
1952 births
Italian male cyclists
Cyclists from the Province of Treviso
UCI Track Cycling World Champions (men)
Italian track cyclists